3:10 to Yuma is a 1957 American Western film directed by Delmer Daves, starring Glenn Ford and Van Heflin. Based on a 1953 short story by Elmore Leonard, it is about a drought-impoverished rancher who takes on the risky job of escorting a notorious outlaw to justice. In 2012, it was selected for preservation in the United States National Film Registry by the Library of Congress as "culturally, historically, or aesthetically significant".

The title song, "The 3:10 to Yuma", was written by George Duning (music) and Ned Washington (lyrics), and sung at the beginning and end of the film by Frankie Laine. He recorded it for Columbia Records in 1957 with the Jimmy Carroll Orchestra and in 1960 with the Johnny Williams Orchestra. It was also recorded by Sandy Denny in 1967, for Island Records. The film was remade in 2007, directed by James Mangold and starring Russell Crowe with Christian Bale.

Plot
In the Arizona Territory of the 1880s, struggling rancher Dan Evans and his two sons witness a gang led by notorious outlaw Ben Wade rob a stagecoach. When the stagecoach driver manages to overpower one of the robbers, Wade calmly shoots both men dead. On the way to Mexico, the robbers stop at a saloon in Bisbee for drinks. Wade alerts the town marshal of the robbery and the murders. A posse is assembled and Wade instructs his men to ride across the border to safety until he can rejoin them, while the posse heads back toward the stage. The posse meets up with Dan and the stagecoach company's owner, Mr. Butterfield, who accompany the lawmen as they head to the saloon. Charlie Prince, Wade's second in charge, returns to Bisbee to see what is holding up Wade just before the posse arrives back in town. Evans distracts Wade, allowing the marshal to come up behind Wade and arrest him. Prince is shot in the hand, but escapes on his horse to retrieve the rest of the gang.

The marshal requests two volunteers to escort Wade to Contention City to catch a train, the 3:10 to Yuma, where he can be held for trial. Butterfield offers to pay any volunteer $200, and Dan and a drunkard posse member named Alex Potter volunteer their services. The marshal has a man pretending to be Wade placed on a stagecoach leaving town that evening, hoping to mislead Wade's men and buy Dan and Potter some time. Wade is taken to Dan's ranch, where Alice Evans, his wife, learns of her husband's decision. Wade is subsequently moved to Contention City, where Dan and Potter meet Butterfield in a hotel room to wait for the train. Wade tries to bribe Dan into letting him go; Dan's refusal to do so impresses the outlaw.

The slain stagecoach driver's brother, Bob Moons, arrives and barges into the hotel room seeking revenge. Dan wrestles his gun away, but it goes off. Prince, having secretly tracked the party to Contention, hears the gunshot and alerts Wade's gang. The local sheriff is out of town, so Butterfield hires five local men to provide security while Wade is taken to the rail station. As the gang surrounds the hotel the locals run off, once again leaving only Dan, Alex, and Butterfield. Alex saves Dan from getting shot by an outlaw on the roof, but Prince shoots Alex in the back and has the men hang him from the hotel chandelier. Butterfield is horrified and offers to give Dan his money, planning to release Wade. Alice arrives and tries to change her husband's mind, but he is committed to see Wade brought to justice. Dan takes Wade out a back door, skillfully moving him across town as the outlaws fire at them.

The outlaws finally catch up to Dan as the train starts to leave. Prince shouts for Wade to drop down so he can shoot Dan. Instead, Wade tells Dan to jump into the passing car, and they leap to safety together. The gang runs after the train, but Dan shoots Prince dead and the rest give up pursuit. Wade explains that he owed Dan a favor for saving his life earlier, and he claims that he has broken out of the Yuma jail before, meaning Dan will be able to claim his reward honestly. Alice sees Dan leave safely on the train as rain pours down on her, breaking the long drought.

Cast 

 Glenn Ford as Ben Wade
 Van Heflin as Dan Evans
 Felicia Farr as Emmy
 Leora Dana as Alice Evans
 Henry Jones as Alex Potter
 Richard Jaeckel as Charlie Prince
 Robert Emhardt as Mr Butterfield
 Sheridan Comerate as Bob Moons
 George Mitchell as Mac
 Robert Ellenstein as Ernie Collins
 Ford Rainey as Marshal of Bisbee
 Woodrow Chambliss as blacksmith (uncredited)
 Boyd Stockman as Bill Moons (uncredited)
 Barry Curtis as Mathew Evans (uncredited)
 Jerry Hartleben as Mark Evans (uncredited)
 Dorothy Adams as Mrs. Potter (uncredited)

Production and reception
David Heilweil brought the story to The Associates and Aldrich, the production company of Robert Aldrich. Halsted Welles did a script. Aldrich sold this to Columbia for $100,000.

When first released in the summer of 1957, the film became popular among audiences and critics alike for its suspense and sharp black-and-white cinematography. Ford received favorable  notice for his atypical role as a villain. The following year, 3:10 to Yuma was nominated for the British Academy of Film and Television Arts award for Best Film and the Laurel Award for Top Male Action Star, which went to Van Heflin.

The film caused "Yuma" to enter the lexicon of Cuban slang: Yumas is literally Cuban for Gringos and used to describe American Visitors, while La Yuma is the United States.

A 2007 remake under James Mangold’s direction of Russell Crowe and Christian Bale was critically successful.

A region 1 DVD was released in 2002. A region A/1 Blu-ray DVD of the film was released as part of The Criterion Collection in 2013.

See also 
 List of American films of 1957
 3:10 to Yuma (2007 film), a remake of the 1957 film, directed by James Mangold and starring Russell Crowe (as Wade) and Christian Bale (as Evans).
 Arctic Blue, a 1993 take off of "3:10 to Yuma" set in Alaska, directed by Peter Masterson and starring Rutger Hauer.

References

Further reading
 Bosley Crowther's review in 1957:

External links 
 
 
 
 
3:10 to Yuma: Curious Distances an essay by Kent Jones at the Criterion Collection

1957 Western (genre) films
1957 films
American Western (genre) films
American black-and-white films
Columbia Pictures films
1950s English-language films
Films based on American short stories
Films based on works by Elmore Leonard
Films directed by Delmer Daves
Films scored by George Duning
Films set in Arizona
Films set in the 1880s
Films shot in Arizona
Films shot in California
United States National Film Registry films
Yuma, Arizona
Revisionist Western (genre) films
1950s American films